Andreas Štrauch (born 22 February 1994) is a Slovak professional ice hockey player who currently plays professionally in Slovakia for MHk 32 Liptovský Mikuláš of the Slovak Extraliga.

Career statistics

Regular season and playoffs

References

External links

 

1994 births
Living people
Slovak ice hockey right wingers
Sportspeople from Poprad
HK Poprad players
HC Nové Zámky players
HKM Zvolen players
HK Dukla Michalovce players
MHk 32 Liptovský Mikuláš players
HK Spišská Nová Ves players
Expatriate ice hockey players in Hungary
Slovak expatriate ice hockey people
Slovak expatriate sportspeople in Hungary